Douglas Lindsay Parks (21 June 1899 – 18 June 1984) was an Australian rules footballer who played with Fitzroy in the Victorian Football League (VFL).

Notes

External links 

1899 births
1984 deaths
Australian rules footballers from Victoria (Australia)
Fitzroy Football Club players